Something to Say is the seventh album by guitarist/vocalist Richie Kotzen.

Track listing

The Japanese version has the songs in distinct order and includes the bonus track "Paradox" (2:42).

Personnel
Richie Kotzen – all vocals, guitars, bass, wurlitzer piano, drums (on "Turned Out", "Ready", "Holy Man")
Kim Bullard – Hammond B3 organ (on "Bitter End", "Let Me In", "Aberdine), mellotron (on "Aberdine")
Arlan Schierbaum – Hammond B3 organ (on "What Makes A Man", "Ready", "Turned Out" and "Holy Man")
Atma Anur – drums, percussion
Lole Diro and Dexter Smittle – recorder, mixing
Wally Traugott – mastering at Capitol

Richie Kotzen albums
1997 albums
Spitfire Records albums